Stanisław Jędryka (27 July 1933 – 22 April 2019) was a Polish film director and writer. A graduate of the National Film School in Łódź (1956). Mostly known for films aimed at children and young adults, he directed 25 films between 1954 and 1992.

Selected filmography
 1962 - The Impossible Goodbye 
 1965 - Wyspa złoczyńców 
 1969 - Do przerwy 0:1 (TV series)
 1970 - Wakacje z duchami (TV series)
 1972 - Podróż za jeden uśmiech 
 1973 - Stawiam na Tolka Banana  (TV series)
 1988 - Banda Rudego Pająka (TV series)

References

External links

1933 births
2019 deaths
Polish film directors